The Legislative Assembly of British Columbia is the deliberative assembly of the Parliament of British Columbia, in the province of British Columbia, Canada. The Legislative Assembly meets in Victoria. Members are elected from provincial ridings and are referred to as members of the Legislative Assembly (MLAs). Bills passed by the legislature are given royal assent by the Canadian monarch, represented by the lieutenant governor of British Columbia.

The current Parliament is the 42nd Parliament. The most recent general election was held on October 24, 2020. Proceedings of the Legislative Assembly are broadcast to cable viewers in the province by Hansard Broadcasting Services.

Recent parliaments

Officeholders

Speaker
 Speaker of the Legislative Assembly of British Columbia: Raj Chouhan (BC NDP)

Other chair occupants
 Deputy speaker; chair, Committee of the Whole: Spencer Chandra Herbert & Ronna-Rae Leonard (BC NDP)
 Assistant deputy speaker: Norm Letnick (BC Liberal)

Leaders
 Premier of British Columbia: David Eby (BC NDP)
 Leader of the Opposition: Kevin Falcon (BC Liberal)
 Green Party leader: Sonia Furstenau

House leaders
 Government House leader:  Ravi Kahlon (BC NDP)
 Opposition House leader: Todd Stone (BC Liberal)
 Green Party House leader: Sonia Furstenau (BC Green)

See also
 Executive Council of British Columbia
 Legislative Council of British Columbia
 List of British Columbia provincial electoral districts (2001–2009)
 BC Legislature Raids

References

External links 
 

Parliament of British Columbia
British Columbia
British Columbia
1871 establishments in British Columbia